Odontosciara is a genus of dark-winged fungus gnats in the family Sciaridae. There are at least 30 described species in Odontosciara.

Species
These 31 species belong to the genus Odontosciara:

 Odontosciara anodonta Yang, Zhang & Yang, 1993 c g
 Odontosciara beebei (Shaw & Shaw, 1950) c g
 Odontosciara cyclota Yang, Zhang & Yang, 1995 c g
 Odontosciara dolichopoda Yang, Zhang & Yang, 1993 c g
 Odontosciara exacta (Brunetti, 1912) c g
 Odontosciara filipes (Walker, 1865) c g
 Odontosciara fimbripes Edwards, 1931 c g
 Odontosciara flavicingula Edwards, 1927 c g
 Odontosciara fruhstorferi (Rubsaamen, 1894) c g
 Odontosciara fujiana Yang & Zhang, 2003 c g
 Odontosciara fulviventris (Wiedemann, 1821) c g
 Odontosciara grandis Mohrig, 2003 c g
 Odontosciara impostor (Brunetti, 1912) c g
 Odontosciara inconspicus (Brunetti, 1912) c g
 Odontosciara lobifera Edwards, 1928 c g
 Odontosciara longiantenna Yang, Zhang & Yang, 1993 c g
 Odontosciara malayana Edwards, 1928 c g
 Odontosciara mirispina Yang, Zhang & Yang, 1998 c g
 Odontosciara nigra (Wiedemann, 1821) i c g b
 Odontosciara nocta Mohrig, 2003 c g
 Odontosciara nyctoptera Edwards, 1931 c g
 Odontosciara pacifica (Edwards, 1924) c g
 Odontosciara perpallida Edwards, 1925 c g
 Odontosciara politicollis (Edwards, 1928) c g
 Odontosciara psychina (Enderlein, 1911) c g
 Odontosciara pubericornis Edwards, 1928 c g
 Odontosciara quadrisetosa (Brunetti, 1912) c g
 Odontosciara ruficoxa (Brunetti, 1912) c g
 Odontosciara sexsetosa (Brunetti, 1912) c g
 Odontosciara trivittigera (Edwards, 1928) c g
 Odontosciara walkeri (Rubsaamen, 1894) c g

Data sources: i = ITIS, c = Catalogue of Life, g = GBIF, b = Bugguide.net

References

Further reading

 
 

Sciaridae
Articles created by Qbugbot
Sciaroidea genera